Grevillea erinacea is a species of flowering plant in the family Proteaceae and is endemic to the south-west of Western Australia. It is a spreading shrub with deeply-divided leaves with three to five linear lobes, rotated through 90°, and cream-coloured flowers with a white style.

Description
The flowers are arranged in more or less spherical to dome-shaped groups along a woolly-hairy rachis.

Taxonomy
Grevillea erinacea was first formally described in 1855 by Carl Meissner in Hooker's Journal of Botany and Kew Garden Miscellany based on material collected by James Drummond. The specific epithet (erinacea) means "hedgehog", referring to the prickly leaves.

Distribution and habitat
This grevillea grows in heath and shrubland in the area between Ellendale, Three Springs and Arrowsmith in the Avon Wheatbelt and Geraldton Sandplains biogeographic regions of south-western Western Australia.

Conservation status
Grevillea erinacea is listed as "Priority Three" by the Government of Western Australia Department of Biodiversity, Conservation and Attractions, meaning that it is poorly known and known from only a few locations but is not under imminent threat.

See also
 List of Grevillea species

References

erinacea
Endemic flora of Western Australia
Eudicots of Western Australia
Proteales of Australia
Taxa named by Carl Meissner
Plants described in 1855